Björn Hendrickx (born 10 April 1974) is a Belgian rower. He competed at the 1996 Summer Olympics and the 2000 Summer Olympics.

References

1974 births
Living people
Belgian male rowers
Olympic rowers of Belgium
Rowers at the 1996 Summer Olympics
Rowers at the 2000 Summer Olympics
Sportspeople from Ostend
20th-century Belgian people